Tothill Fields was an area of Westminster in the county of Middlesex that lay south of St James's Park on the north bank of the river Thames. One of its main features was the Tothill Fields Bridewell penitentiary.

Between 1735 and 1752, it was the home venue of the Westminster Cricket Club. The earliest known match there was in August 1735, when Westminster defeated London by 3 wickets. Records have survived of two Westminster matches there in 1752, both against Addington. The result of the first is unknown and Westminster won the second by 10 runs.

References

External links
 

1735 establishments in England
Cricket grounds in Middlesex
Cricket in Middlesex
Defunct cricket grounds in England
Defunct sports venues in London
English cricket venues in the 18th century
History of Middlesex
Middlesex
Sport in London
Sports venues completed in 1735
Sports venues in London
City of Westminster